Herbert Wilcox was an English professional footballer who played as a left back in the Football League for Burnley.

References

English footballers
Association football fullbacks
Bury F.C. players
Burnley F.C. players
Chorley F.C. players
Rossendale United F.C. players
English Football League players
Year of death missing
Year of birth missing